is a passenger railway station in the city of Kisarazu, Chiba Prefecture, Japan, operated by the East Japan Railway Company (JR East).

Lines
Iwane Station is served by the Uchibo Line, and is located 27.5 km from the starting point of the line at Soga Station.

Station layout
Iwane Station consists of dual opposed side platforms serving two tracks, connected to the station building by a footbridge. The station is staffed.

Platforms

History
Iwane Station was opened on November 20, 1941 as a station on the Japanese Government Railways (JGR) Bōsōnishi Line. It became part of the Japan National Railways (JNR) after World War II, and the line was renamed the Uchibō Line from July 15, 1972. Iwane Station was absorbed into the JR East network upon the privatization of the Japan National Railways (JNR) on April 1, 1987.

Passenger statistics
In fiscal 2019, the station was used by an average of 1715 passengers daily (boarding passengers only).

Surrounding area
 Tokyo Bay Aqua-Line

See also
 List of railway stations in Japan

References

External links

JR East Station information  

Railway stations in Japan opened in 1941
Railway stations in Chiba Prefecture
Uchibō Line
Kisarazu